Warszawa Powiśle, in English Warsaw Powiśle, is an urban railway station in Warsaw, Poland. Located in the neighborhood of Powiśle in borough of Śródmieście (Downtown), stretching between Aleje Jerozolimskie near Rondo Charles'a de Gaulle'a (high-level entrance), and the intersection of Aleja 3 Maja and ul. Kruczkowskiego (low-level entrance).

Details 
The station sits on a rail embankment extending from the terrace of the Vistula river on which the city centre is built, ending at its western side with the entrance to the Cross-City tunnel. The station has two side platforms flanking the suburban tracks of the Warsaw Cross-City Line used by the regional and suburban trains run by Koleje Mazowieckie and Szybka Kolej Miejska. The mainline tracks can be seen from the station. They are located behind a fence, which extends for the length of the station. The station building was designed in 1955, by architects Arseniusz Romanowicz and Piotr Szymaniak. The location allows for convenient transfers to city trams and buses serving the eastern part of the city centre.

The station is used for passing mainline trains, when there are engineering works on the mainline. Suburban trains may skip the station and use the mainline tracks, if there are engineering works on the suburban tracks. There is no connection between the suburban and mainline tracks at the station or immediately before or after it.

The café-bar 
In 2009, the club-and-restaurant company Grupa Warszawa opened a café-bar in the station's renovated former ticket office rented from the Polish State Railways. The bar has become one of the most popular venues in Warsaw. In 2013, Gazeta Wyborcza called the Warszawa Powiśle one of the "10 pubs that changed Warsaw."

References

External links

Railway stations in Poland opened in 1954
Powisle
Railway stations served by Koleje Mazowieckie
Railway stations served by Szybka Kolej Miejska (Warsaw)
Śródmieście, Warsaw